This is a detailed table of the National Register of Historic Places listing in Camas County, Idaho.

This is intended to be a detailed table of the property on the National Register of Historic Places in Camas County, Idaho, United States.  Latitude and longitude coordinates are provided for many National Register properties and districts; this may be seen in a map.

There is 1 property listed on the National Register in the county.  More may be added; properties and districts nationwide are added to the Register weekly.

Current listings

|}

See also
 List of National Historic Landmarks in Idaho
 National Register of Historic Places listings in Idaho

References

Camas